San Joaquín is a district of the Flores canton, in the Heredia province of Costa Rica.

Toponymy
The town of San Joaquín de Flores is named after Saint Joachim, Mary's father.

Geography 
San Joaquín has an area of  km² and an elevation of  metres.

Communities and settlements 
San Joaquín de Flores District is further divided into smaller units called poblados (or communities) and barrios (or neighborhoods):

 Santa Marta
 Santísima Trinidad
 Santa Cecilia
 Llorente
 Barrantes
 Las Flores
 Los Ángeles
 Los Geranios
 Echeverría
 El Rosario
 Cristo Rey
 Corazón de Jesús

Important buildings

San Joaquín church was built about 1880. Every rock that is part of the church was carried from Cartago by cart, 87 km away along the current national Route 225. Families of San Joaquín donated the statues that today decorate the church gardens. The Spanish painter Jose Claro—who also made paintings for a church in San Antonio de Prado, near Medellín, Colombia—painted the images inside the church. It has also a cavern with a Lourdes Virgin and armchairs made of stone to sit down and view the garden flowers.

Education
The official San Joaquin primary school is Escuela Estados Unidos de America
Liceo Regional de Flores and Colegio Tecnico are the two public high schools located in San Joaquin.

Demographics 

For the 2011 census, San Joaquín had a population of  inhabitants.

Transportation

Road transportation 
The district is covered by the following road routes:
 National Route 123

Rail transportation 
The Interurbano Line operated by Incofer goes through this district.

External links
San Joaquin Library History

References 

Districts of Heredia Province
Populated places in Heredia Province